Madison Lintz (born May 11, 1999) is an American actress known for her roles as Sophia Peletier in the AMC post-apocalyptic television drama series The Walking Dead (2010–2012) and as Madeline "Maddie" Bosch in the Amazon Prime Video series Bosch (2015–2021) and its revival on Amazon Freevee Bosch: Legacy (2022–present).

Career 
Lintz's acting career began when she was six years old, filming commercials and voice-overs.

She appeared in the first two seasons of AMC's post-apocalyptic series The Walking Dead, playing Carol Peletier's daughter Sophia. She has appeared in the television series Nashville and It's Supernatural. She played the supporting role of Maddie Bosch in the Amazon series Bosch from 2015 until the series ended in 2021, portraying the daughter of the titular character, Harry Bosch. Lintz reprised her role in the spinoff series, Bosch: Legacy, which premiered on Amazon Freevee on May 6, 2022.

She appeared in the independent film Newbourne County (2011) and two 2012 films, Parental Guidance and After.

Personal life 

Lintz was born on May 11, 1999, to Kelly Collins Lintz, an actress who played a role in We're the Millers, and Marc Lintz, a real estate agent. Lintz's three siblings are Mackenzie, Matt, and Macsen. Her brothers have both appeared on The Walking Dead as Carol's adopted son Henry; Macsen played the young version of Henry from 2016 to 2018, and Matt played the older version of Henry from 2018 to 2019. In 2012, Lintz was living with her family in Alpharetta, Georgia, and was being home-schooled. She later attended Covenant Christian Academy.

Filmography

Awards and nominations

References

External links 

 

1999 births
21st-century American women
Actresses from Georgia (U.S. state)
American child actresses
American film actresses
American television actresses
Living people
People from Alpharetta, Georgia
Place of birth missing (living people)